In statistical mechanics, the Zimm–Bragg model is a helix-coil transition model that describes helix-coil transitions of macromolecules, usually polymer chains. Most models provide a reasonable approximation of the fractional helicity of a given polypeptide; the Zimm–Bragg model differs by incorporating the ease of propagation (self-replication) with respect to nucleation. It is named for co-discoverers Bruno H. Zimm and J. K. Bragg.

Helix-coil transition models
Helix-coil transition models assume that polypeptides are linear chains composed of interconnected segments. Further, models group these sections into two broad categories: coils, random conglomerations of disparate unbound pieces, are represented by the letter 'C', and helices, ordered states where the chain has assumed a structure stabilized by hydrogen bonding, are represented by the letter 'H'.

Thus, it is possible to loosely represent a macromolecule as a string such as CCCCHCCHCHHHHHCHCCC and so forth. The number of coils and helices factors into the calculation of fractional helicity, defined as

where
 is the average helicity and
 is the number of helix or coil units.

Zimm–Bragg

The Zimm–Bragg model takes the cooperativity of each segment into consideration when calculating fractional helicity. The probability of any given monomer being a helix or coil is affected by which the previous monomer is; that is, whether the new site is a nucleation or propagation.

By convention, a coil unit ('C') is always of statistical weight 1.

For most proteins,

which makes the propagation of a helix more favorable than nucleation of a helix from coil state.

From these parameters, it is possible to compute the fractional helicity . The average helicity  is given by

where  is the partition function given by the sum of the probabilities of each site on the polypeptide. The fractional helicity is thus given by the equation

Statistical mechanics
The Zimm–Bragg model is equivalent to a one-dimensional Ising model and has no long-range interactions, i.e., interactions between residues well separated along the backbone; therefore, by the famous argument of Rudolf Peierls, it cannot undergo a phase transition.

The statistical mechanics of the Zimm–Bragg model may be solved exactly using the transfer-matrix method.  The two parameters of the Zimm–Bragg model are σ, the statistical weight for nucleating a helix and s, the statistical weight for propagating a helix.  These parameters may depend on the residue j; for example, a proline residue may easily nucleate a helix but not propagate one; a leucine residue may nucleate and propagate a helix easily; whereas glycine may disfavor both the nucleation and propagation of a helix.  Since only nearest-neighbour interactions are considered in the Zimm–Bragg model, the full partition function for a chain of N residues can be written as follows

where the 2x2 transfer matrix Wj of the jth residue equals the matrix of statistical weights for the state transitions

The row-column entry in the transfer matrix equals the statistical weight for making a transition from state row in residue j − 1 to state column in residue j.  The two states here are helix (the first) and coil (the second).  Thus, the upper left entry s is the statistical weight for transitioning from helix to helix, whereas the lower left entry σs is that for transitioning from coil to helix.

See also
 Alpha helix
 Lifson–Roig model
 Random coil
 Statistical mechanics

References

Polymer physics
Protein structure
Statistical mechanics
Thermodynamic models